Mai-Mne Subregion also call(Quahayn tigrigna ቋሓይን) is one of the 12 important subregions of the Southern region in Eritrea. It is known for its nutural resources like gold and many types of granites. The people of this sub region are mostly farmers. There are three ethnic groups. 

Tigrigna about 99 %

And the remaining are Saho and Tigre 

About 96 % are Christians. Which is orthodox Christians.

References

Subregions of Eritrea

Southern Region (Eritrea)
Subregions of Eritrea